Olaz is a locality and council located in the municipality of Valle de Egüés, in Navarre province, Spain, Spain. As of 2020, it has a population of 702.

Geography 
Olaz is located 8km east of Pamplona.

References

Populated places in Navarre